The swimming competition at the 1979 Summer Universiade took place in Mexico City, Mexico in September 1979.

Men's events

Legend:

Women's events

Legend:

References
Medalist Summary (Men) on GBRATHLETICS.com
Medalist Summary (Women) on GBRATHLETICS.com

1979 in swimming
Swimming at the Summer Universiade
1979 Summer Universiade